The World According to Garp is a 1982 American comedy-drama film produced and directed by George Roy Hill and starring Robin Williams in the title role. Written by Steve Tesich, it is based on the 1978 novel The World According to Garp by John Irving. For their roles, John Lithgow and Glenn Close (in her film debut) were respectively nominated for Best Actor in a Supporting Role and Best Actress in a Supporting Role at the 55th Academy Awards.

Plot
T.S. Garp is the out-of-wedlock son of a feminist mother, Jenny Fields, who wanted a child but not a husband. A nurse during World War II, she encounters a dying ball turret gunner known only as Technical Sergeant Garp ("Garp" being all he is able to utter) who was severely brain damaged in combat, whose morbid priapism allows her to rape him and get impregnated. She names the resultant child after Garp.

Garp grows up and becomes interested in wrestling and fiction writing, topics his mother has little interest in. Garp's writing piques the interest of Helen Holm, the daughter of the school's wrestling coach. She is wary of him. His mother observes his interest in sex and is intellectually curious about it, having little more than clinical interest herself. She interviews a prostitute and offers to hire her for Garp. Immediately after, Jenny decides to write a book on her observations of lust and human sexuality.

Her book is a partial autobiography, called Sexual Suspect, and is an overnight sensation. Jenny becomes a feminist icon. She uses the proceeds from the book to fund a center at her home for troubled and abused women. Meanwhile, Garp's first novel is published, which impresses Helen. The two marry and eventually have two children, Duncan and Walt. Garp becomes a devoted parent and successful fiction writer, while Helen becomes a college professor.

Garp spends time visiting his mother and the people who live at her center, including transgender ex-football player Roberta Muldoon. He also first hears the story of Ellen James, a girl who was raped at the age of eleven by two men who then cut out her tongue so that she could not identify her attackers. A group of women represented at Jenny's center, "Ellen Jamesians," voluntarily cut out their own tongues as a show of solidarity. Garp is horrified by the practice and learns that the Jamesians have received a letter from Ellen James begging them to stop the practice, but they have voted to continue. Garp flirts with and possibly seduces his children's 18-year-old babysitter while driving her home.

Having learned about his wife's infidelity with one of her students, Garp rushes home with his children in the back seat and crashes into his wife's lover's car parked in their driveway, while his wife is in the car performing fellatio on the student. As a result, Walt is killed and Duncan loses an eye. Garp, through the aid of his mother, learns to forgive himself and his wife. The couple reconcile and have a baby daughter they name after Jenny.

Jenny receives death threats because of both her center and her book. To Garp's dismay, she dismisses the danger and decides to publicly endorse a politician who supports her message. Garp writes a book about the life of Ellen James and its aftermath. The book is very successful and well-regarded, but is highly critical of the Jamesians. Garp begins receiving death threats from them himself.

During a political rally, Jenny is shot and killed by an anti-feminist fanatic. The women of Jenny's center hold a memorial for her, but forbid all men from attending. Garp, dressed as a woman, is infiltrated into the memorial by Muldoon. He is identified by Pooh, a Jamesian he knew when they both were in school. A commotion breaks out and Garp is in danger of being hurt, until a woman leads him out of the memorial to a taxi. The woman reveals herself to be Ellen James, and uses the gesture to thank Garp for his book about her. The Jamesians are further outraged that Garp attended the memorial.

Garp returns to his old school as the wrestling coach. One day during practice, Pooh enters the gymnasium and shoots him at close range with a pistol. Garp is airlifted by helicopter with his wife. He flashes back to an earlier time when his mother would toss him into the air.

Cast

 Robin Williams as T.S. Garp
James "J.B." McCall as young Garp
 Mary Beth Hurt as Helen Holm
 Glenn Close as Jenny Fields
 John Lithgow as Roberta Muldoon
 Hume Cronyn as Mr. Fields
 Jessica Tandy as Mrs. Fields
 Swoosie Kurtz as The Hooker
 Peter Michael Goetz as John Wolf
 Mark Soper as Michael Milton
 Warren Berlinger as Stew Percy
 Brandon Maggart as Ernie Holm
 Amanda Plummer as Ellen James
 Jenny Wright as Cushie (Steering School)
 Jillian Kaplan Reich Ross as Young Cushie
 Brenda Currin as Pooh
 John Irving as wrestling referee
 George Roy Hill as airplane pilot
 Kate McGregor-Stewart as Real Estate Lady

Reception
Rotten Tomatoes gave the film a score of 70% based on reviews from 20 critics, as of September 2022.

Film critic Roger Ebert of the Chicago Sun-Times gave the film three stars out of four, by which he was "entertained but unmoved," three stars as a "palatable" interpretation of the novel, considering it "wonderfully well-written" yet "cruel, annoying and smug," and wrote:

I thought the acting was unconventional and absorbing (especially by Williams, by Glenn Close as his mother, and by John Lithgow as a transsexual). I thought the visualization of the events, by director George Roy Hill, was fresh and consistently interesting. But when the movie was over, my immediate response was not at all what it should have been. All I could find to ask myself was: What the hell was that all about?

Janet Maslin of The New York Times wrote that "the movie is a very fair rendering of Mr. Irving's novel, with similar strengths and weaknesses. If the novel was picaresque and precious, so is the film – although the absence of the book's self-congratulatory streak helps the movie achieve a much lighter, more easy-going style."

Film critic Pauline Kael wrote, "There's no feeling of truth in either the book or the movie," and that this "generally faithful adaptation, seems no more (and no less) than a castration fantasy."

However, Leonard Maltin, in his annual Movie Guide, gave the film a rare four-star review—one of only 408 films out of nearly 16,000 given the designation during the 45-year period that it was published. Calling Garp "dazzling" and "beautifully acted by all, especially Close (in her film debut)...and Lithgow," Maltin went on to praise the film as an "absorbing, sure-footed odyssey through vignettes of social observation, absurdist humor, satire and melodrama."

References

External links 

 
 
 

1982 films
Films based on works by John Irving
Films about writers
Films set in 1944
1980s English-language films
1980s romantic comedy-drama films
American romantic comedy-drama films
Films about trans women
Warner Bros. films
Films directed by George Roy Hill
1982 LGBT-related films
American LGBT-related films
Adultery in films
Films set in New Hampshire
Films shot in New Jersey
Films about rape
1982 comedy films
LGBT-related comedy-drama films
Films about mother–son relationships
1980s American films